Club Social y Deportivo Jalisco, A.C. is a Mexican football team. The team was founded on 1970 and returned on 2015.

History 
In 1970 a group of sugar businessmen acquired C.D. Oro and renamed it as Club Jalisco. The team stayed 10 seasons in the First Division from 1970 until 1980. In its trajectory, the team could never reach the championship phase.

In 1980, the team finished in the last place of the competition, had to play a relegation playoff, the series was against Unión de Curtidores, Jalisco was defeated by an aggregate score of 4–3 and so, the club was relegated to Segunda División.

For the 1983-84 season, Jalisco reached the final of the second division, finally defeated by the Zacatepec with an aggregate of 3–1. Being the last time in which the club has been close to being promoted to the highest category of Mexican football.

In 1991 Club Jalisco sold its franchise, the new owners relocated the team to Acapulco and renamed it as Delfines de Acapulco.

In 2015, two different groups created two new teams trying to revive the history of the Club Jalisco. On the one hand, a team from the city of El Salto changed its name unofficially to Jalisco. On the other hand, former club players founded another team called Gallos Viejos, which continues to play in the Third Division.

In June 2019, Club Jalisco signed an agreement with Deportivo CAFESSA, through this document a new club called Deportivo CAFESSA Jalisco was established, which represented the return of Club Jalisco to football, since the other teams had only taken up the name of the team without having a direct relationship with the directive. After that, the new team began playing in the Liga Premier de México – Serie A and won the right to use the Estadio Jalisco as their home venue.

Honors

Runner up Segunda División de México 1984

See also
Primera División de México
CD Oro
Jalisco Stadium

Footnotes

Football clubs in Jalisco
Football clubs in Mexico
Football clubs in Guadalajara, Jalisco
Association football clubs established in 1970
1970 establishments in Mexico